Bergbahnregion/Schwarzatal is a former Verwaltungsgemeinschaft ("municipal association") in the district Saalfeld-Rudolstadt, in Thuringia, Germany. The seat of the Verwaltungsgemeinschaft was in Oberweißbach. It was disbanded in January 2019.

The Verwaltungsgemeinschaft Bergbahnregion/Schwarzatal consisted of the following municipalities:
Cursdorf 
Deesbach 
Katzhütte 
Meuselbach-Schwarzmühle 
Oberweißbach

References

Former Verwaltungsgemeinschaften in Thuringia